Sgùrr Fhuaran is a Scottish mountain that is situated on the northern side of Glen Shiel,  east south east of Kyle of Lochalsh.

Overview 

The meaning of the mountain’s name is obscure. Sgùrr Fhuaran may mean "Peak of wells or springs" and many streams issue from the mountains slopes. Other possible meanings proposed are that the proper name is Sgùrr Urain, the Peak of Odhran, named after a disciple of Columba, or that the second part of the name derives from "odhran-choin", here meaning "wolf". The mountain is referred to in the slogan "Sgùrr Uaran" of Clan Macrae (which occupied lands in the Kintail area).

Geography 
The legend of the Five Sisters of Kintail tells the story of seven sisters, daughters of a local farmer, two of whom married visiting brothers who said they would send their five other brothers for the remaining five sisters to wed. However, no one returned and the five remaining sisters agreed for a local wizard to transform them into peaks in order to preserve their beauty while they waited.

Sgùrr Fhuaran is a distinctive peak with steep slopes which drop away to Glen Shiel on its western flank at an angle of over 30 degrees giving the mountain a feeling of great height.

The eastern ridge which is a narrow knife edge in places gives a dramatic ascent route from Glenlicht House at the head of the remote Gleann Lichd. Between the southern and eastern ridges lies the impressive Coire Domhain to which the mountain drops almost vertically. It is one of the Five Sisters and regarded by many as the finest, being narrow and exposed. This northern ridge continues for a further  to reach sea level at the shores of Loch Duich.

Ascents 
The direct ascent of Sgùrr Fhuaran starts at sea level at the foot of Glen Shiel (grid reference ): before the A87 crosses the Shiel bridge, a grass path on the north side of the river and loch Shiel leads to the remains of a footbridge and an unrelenting steep climb up the WNW ridge. A more interesting variation takes in Sgùrr na Saighead on the way and then follows the north ridge to the main summit. The best solution to this is to start at Morvich in Strath Croe and walk up Gleann Lichd to its head, before ascending to walk the ridge south to north, finishing at the shores of Loch Duich near the day's starting point.

Notes

References
The Munros, Donald Bennet et al.: Scottish Mountaineering Trust: 
100 Best Routes on Scottish Mountains, Ralph Storer, 
Hamish’s Mountain Walk, Hamish Brown, 
The High Mountains of Britain and Ireland, Irvine Butterfield, 
The Magic Of The Munros, Irvine Butterfield, 
The Munros, Britains Highest Mountains, Cameron McNeish, 

Munros
Marilyns of Scotland
Mountains and hills of the Northwest Highlands
One-thousanders of Scotland